Early childhood caries (ECC), formerly known as nursing bottle caries, baby bottle tooth decay, night bottle mouth and night bottle caries, is a disease that affects teeth in children aged between birth and 71 months. ECC is characterized by the presence of 1 or more decayed (noncavitated or cavitated lesions), missing (due to caries), or filled tooth surfaces in any primary tooth. ECC has been shown to be a very common, transmissible bacterial infection, usually passed from the primary caregiver to the child. The main bacteria responsible for dental caries are Streptococcus mutans (S. mutans) and Lactobacillus. There is also evidence that supports that those who are in lower socioeconomic populations are at greater risk of developing ECC.

Aetiology 
Early childhood caries (ECC) is a multi-factorial disease, referring to various risk factors that inter-relate to increase risk of developing the disease. These risk factors include but not limits to, cariogenic bacteria, diet practices and socioeconomic factors. Normally after 6 months, deciduous teeth begin to erupt means, they are susceptible to tooth decay or dental caries. In some unfortunate cases, infants and young children have experienced severe tooth decay called ECC. This can result in the child experiencing severe pain, extensive dental restorations or extractions. The good news is that ECC is preventable, however, still remains a large burden particularly towards health care expenditure.

Microbial factors

The primary cariogenic bacteria involved in ECC are S. mutans and Lactobacillus. The oral flora in an infant oral cavity is not colonised with normal oral flora until the eruption of the primary dentition at approximately 6 to 30 months of age. The colonisation of S. Mutans from mother to infant is well documented. Over time this combination of food debris and bacteria form a biofilm on the tooth surface called plaque. In plaque, the cariogenic microorganisms are those that produce lactic acid as a by-product from fermentable carbohydrates. Examples of these fermentable carbohydrates include fructose, sucrose and glucose. Cariogenic bacteria thrive on these sugars and help them to weaken the adjacent tooth surface. A poor oral care routine and a diet that is high in fermentable carbohydrates favour acidic attack in the oral cavity. This prolonged acidic exposure allows the net loss of minerals from the tooth. This diminishes the strength of the tooth and is called demineralisation. For the outer layer of the tooth (enamel) to reach cavitation, there is a breakdown of the enamel matrix that allows the influx of the cariogenic bacteria. As cavitation progresses into dentine, the dental caries is classified severe, this causes ECC.

Dietary factors
Diet plays a key role in the process of dental caries. The type of foods along with the frequency at which they are consumed can determine the risk it puts for also developing carious lesions. With new products being put on supermarket shelves with irresistible prices, this can largely influence what people buy. It is common for infants and young children to frequently consume fermentable carbohydrates, in the form of liquids. The consumption of liquids containing fermentable carbohydrate, include drinks such as: juice, breast milk, formula, soda. These consumables all have the potential to increase the risk of dental caries due to prolonged contact between sugars in the liquid and cariogenic bacteria on the tooth surface. 
Recent research has shown that breastfeeding does not increase caries risk up to 12 months of age. Poor feeding practices without appropriate preventive measures can lead to a distinctive pattern of caries in susceptible infants and toddlers commonly known as baby bottle tooth decay or ECC. Frequent and long duration bottle feeding, especially at night, is associated with ECC. This finding can be attributed to the fact that there is less salivary flow at night and hence less capacity for buffering and remineralisation. Each time a child drinks these liquids, acids attack for 20 minutes or longer. A parent's education and health awareness has a major influence on the caries experience of their child - feeding practices, dietary habits and food choices.

Socioeconomic factors

Dental caries still today, remains the most prevalent disease worldwide. This means the disease is highly preventable, yet it is still burdening millions of children and into adulthood with pain and potentially lower quality of life. There are several studies by Locker and Mota-Veloso reporting that there is a two-way relationship that exists between dental caries and levels of education, household income that effect quality of life and social positioning. Locker suggested that the relationship between oral disease and health-related quality of life outcomes can be mediated by personal and environmental variables. Previous studies have also mentioned that the rate of ECC has decreased. However, these results can tend to dis-include communities where equity still exists. More health promotion initiatives and policy-making that collaborate directly with the community to increase meeting their needs, should be implemented.

While the primary aetiology is due to microbial factors, it is also largely influenced by the social, behavioral and economic determinants in which children are surrounded by. such factors include living in a low income earning family that may not have the budget to afford visiting a dental clinic. Secondly, having limited access to healthcare and education where important messages about the consumption of carcinogenic foods are not being transferred to children or their parents. Distribution of budget should be made to reach rural and remote communities to implement health promotion strategies to increase awareness about diet and oral hygiene.

The education, occupation and income of families also greatly affects the quality of life. Children greatly rely on their parents or guardians for help concerning their health and well-being. Studies have shown that families of lower socioeconomic status are less likely to regularly attend the dentist and access preventive dental resources. ECC also has an accumulative effect for those that live in rural areas.

Prevention 
Early childhood caries can be prevented through the combination of the following: adhering to a healthy nutritional diet, optimal plaque removal, use of fluoridation on the tooth surface once erupted, care taken by the mother during the pre-natal and peri-natal period and regular dental visits. The following are recommendations to help prevent ECC.

Adequate diet
Dietary habits and the presence of cariogenic bacteria within the oral cavity are an important factor in the risk of ECC. ECC is commonly caused by bottle feeding, frequent snacking and a high sugar diet
In regards to preventing ECC through bottle feeding, it is fundamental not to allow the child to sleep using ‘sippy cups’ or bottles as this is a large factor contributing to baby bottle decay/caries. This is highly encouraged as it prevents continuous exposure to non-milk extrinsic sugars and therefore the potential progression of caries – this means the oral cavity can return to a neutral pH and therefore decreased acidity. These researches also suggest trying to introduce cups to children as they approach their first birthday and to reduce the use of a bottle.
A low-sugar and high nutritional diet is recommended for both the mother and the child especially during breastfeeding, and it is also recommended to avoid frequent snacking

A 2019 Cochrane review concluded that there is a 15% drop in risk of developing ECC, when mother with infants or pregnant women were given advice on a healthy child diet and feeding practices. Consequently, resulting in less decay for the child.

Optimal plaque removal
On eruption of the first primary tooth in a child, tooth brushing and cleaning should be performed by an adult. This is important as the plaque that attaches to the surface of the tooth has bacteria that have the ability to cause caries (decay) on the tooth surface. 
It is recommended to brush children's teeth using a soft bristled, age and size appropriate toothbrush and age appropriate toothpaste twice daily, however children below the age of two usually don't require toothpaste. These researches also suggest that it is suitable to brush children's teeth until they reach the approximate age of 6; where they will begin to learn adequate dexterity and cognition needed for adequate brushing by themselves. It is encouraged to watch children brushing their teeth until they are competently able to brush appropriately alone.

Fluoride
Fluoride is a natural mineral that naturally occurs throughout the world – it is also the active ingredient of many toothpastes specifically for its remineralizing effects on enamel, often repairing the tooth surface and reducing the risk of caries.
The use of fluoridated toothpaste is highly recommended by dental professionals; whereby studies suggest that the correct daily use of fluoride on the dentition of children has a high caries-preventive effect and therefore prevents has potential to prevent ECC. However, it is important to use fluoridated toothpastes correctly; children below the age of two do not usually require toothpaste unless they are already at a high risk of ECC as diagnosed by a dental professional, and therefore it is recommended to use a small sized ‘smear’ of toothpaste to incorporate fluoride, with caution removing the toothpaste from within the mouth and not allowing the child to swallow the substances.

Pre-natal and peri-natal period
Prevention of early childhood caries begins before the baby is born; women are advised to maintain a well-balanced diet of high nutritional value, especially during the third trimester and within the infants first year of life. This is since enamel undergoes maturation; if the diet is not sufficient, a common condition that may occur is enamel hypoplasia. 
Enamel hypoplasia is a developmental defect of enamel that occurs during tooth development, mainly pre-natally or during early childhood. Teeth affected by enamel hypoplasia are commonly at a higher risk of caries since there is an increased loss of minerals and therefore the tooth surface is able to breakdown more easily than in comparison to a non-hypoplastic tooth. It is therefore suggested to the mother to maintain a healthy diet since evidence suggests malnourishment during the perinatal period increases the risk of hypoplastic teeth in an infant.

Dental visits
It is recommended to parents and caregivers to take their children to a dental professional for examination as soon as the first few teeth start to erupt into the oral cavity. The dental professional will assess all the present dentition for early carious demineralization and may provide recommendations to the parents or caregivers the best way to prevent ECC and what actions to take.
Studies suggest that children who have attended visits within the first few years of life (an early preventive dental visit) potentially experience less dental related issues and incur lower dental related costs throughout their lives.

Treatment 
The current standard of care for Severe Early Childhood Caries includes restoration and extraction of carious teeth and, where possible, includes early intervention which includes application of topical fluoride, oral hygiene instructions and education.
The initial visit is important as it allows dental professionals to flag unfavourable behaviour or eating habits. This will also allow dental clinician, working in a collaborative team, to perform diagnostic testing to determine the rate and progression of the disease. This is done by performing risk assessment based on the child's age, as well as the social, behavioural, and medical history of the child. Children at low risk may not need any restorative therapy, and frequent visits should be made to detect possible early lesions. Children at moderate risk may require restoration of progressing and cavitated lesions, while white spot and enamel proximal lesions should be treated by preventive techniques and monitored for progression. Children at high risk, however, may require earlier restorative intervention of enamel proximal lesions, as well as intervention of progressing and cavitated lesions to minimize continual caries development. As Early Childhood Caries occurs in children under the age of 5, restorative treatment is conventionally performed under general anesthetic to prevent a traumatic experience for the child. Still, the literature shows a high rate of caries relapse after treatment under general anesthesia, sometimes as early as 6 months after treatment was rendered.

Dental professionals now have a safe, inexpensive, and less invasive option to manage Early Childhood Caries: Silver Diamine Fluoride (SDF) is a liquid containing silver and fluoride that can be brushed on teeth to stop decay, relieve sensitivity, and prevent cavities from getting worse. Silver kills the bacteria that cause tooth decay and fluoride helps strengthen the tooth. SDF is applied directly to the area of decay without first having to drill the tooth. SDF is an inexpensive option that is simple to apply; however, although it stops the decay from progressing, it does not fill the cavity, and the tooth may still need to be restored with a filling or crown. After treatment with SDF, arrested decay will become black, but a dental provider can cover the treated area with a white filling material if needed. This may be less of a problem in baby teeth, which will be lost as the child ages, than for permanent teeth. Even so, because applying SDF is quick, it may be especially helpful for young children and other patients who have trouble sitting still during dental treatments, avoiding the need for sedation or general anesthesia. However, the use of SDF remains controversial and more good quality research is needed to be conclusive on its effectiveness, its need and its adverse effects on early caries and children's health especially for those in developed countries. This is particularly important in light of the FDA warnings about using general anesthetics and sedation in young children.  The American Dental Association recognizes SDF as an effective approach to conservatively manage dental decay.

Depending on the level of cavitation of the teeth, different types of restorations may be employed. Stainless steel (preformed) crowns are pre-fabricated crown forms which can be adapted to individual primary molars and cemented in place to provide a definitive restoration or can be fitted using the Hall Technique. They have been indicated for the restoration of primary and permanent teeth with caries where a normal filling may not last.

Another approach of treating dental caries in young children is Atraumatic Restorative Treatment (ART). The ART is a procedure based on removing carious tooth tissues using hand instruments alone and restoring the cavity with an adhesive restorative material. This is useful to prevent trauma and requires less chair time for the young patients. This is used in cases where the teeth are being maintained in the mouth to maintain space for the future teeth to come through. Low quality evidence indicates that ART may have a higher risk of filling failure when compared to usual care. Despite the potential for filling failure, ART is still recommended for children when access to electricity, drills, dentists, or other dental resources are limited.

References 

16.Maternal Perception about Early Childhood Caries in Nigeria in Kalipeni, E.; Iwelunmor, J.; Grigsby-Toussaint, D.; and Moise, I. K. (eds.) (In Press, June 2018). Public Health, Disease and Development in Africa. London: Routledge Publishers.

External links 
American Academy of Pediatric Dentistry
American Dental Association ADA page on early childhood tooth decay
Columbia Center Comparison of Dental Surgery versus Caries Suppression with other treatments
Children's Dental Health Project

Acquired tooth disorders
Tooth decay